The 2021–22 Michigan State Spartans men's ice hockey season was the 81st season of play for the program. They represented Michigan State University in the 2021–22 NCAA Division I men's ice hockey season. This season marked the 32nd season in the Big Ten Conference. They were coached by Danton Cole, in his fifth season, and played their home games at Munn Ice Arena.

Season
Michigan State began the season well, posting a winning record through the first month of the season. After dropping both games to arch-rival Michigan, the Spartans dipped below .500 but they responded with four consecutive wins to get back onto the plus side of the ledger. MSU ended the first half of their season with a split against Notre Dame, putting them in a strong position to make a run for a home game in the postseason.

Unfortunately, both the team's offense and defense faltered in the back half of their campaign and the Spartans lost 13 consecutive games. Both goaltenders played during the stretch and performed well, but neither received much help. MSU allowed an average of 37 shots per game, while recording just 27 of their own. While most of their losses were against ranked teams, that would provide little solace as Michigan State finished last in the conference for the fourth time in five years.

They faced Michigan in the first round of the conference tournament and were thoroughly beaten, losing both games by a combined 1–12 score.

Departures

Recruiting

Roster
As of August 12, 2021.

Standings

Schedule and results

|-
!colspan=12 style=";" | Exhibition

|-
!colspan=12 style=";" | Regular Season

|-
!colspan=12 style=";" | 

|-
!colspan=12 style=";" | Regular Season

|-
!colspan=12 style=";" |

Scoring statistics

Goaltending statistics

Rankings

Note: USCHO did not release a poll in week 24.

Players drafted into the NHL

2022 NHL Entry Draft

† incoming freshman

References

External links

2021–22
Michigan State Spartans
Michigan State Spartans
Michigan State Spartans
Michigan State Spartans